Bluefields is a settlement in Westmoreland Parish on the Caribbean island of Jamaica. It contains a major beach, Bluefields Beach.

In Spanish Jamaica, Bluefields was known as Oristan.

The town was named after Abraham Blauvelt, a Dutch-Jewish pirate, privateer, and explorer of Central America and the western Caribbean.

References

Populated places in Westmoreland Parish